Jowshaqan (also Romanized as Jowshaqān and Jūshqān; also known as Isfarāīn) is a village in Azari Rural District, in the Central District of Esfarayen County, North Khorasan Province, Iran. At the 2006 census, its population was 1,132, in 301 families.

References 

Populated places in Esfarayen County